Romania competed at the 1988 Winter Olympics in Calgary, Canada.

Competitors
The following is the list of number of competitors in the Games.

Alpine skiing

Women

Women's combined

Bobsleigh

Cross-country skiing

Women

C = Classical style, F = Freestyle

Women's 4 × 5 km relay

Luge

Women

References

Official Olympic Reports 
 Olympic Winter Games 1988, full results by sports-reference.com

Nations at the 1988 Winter Olympics
1988
1988 in Romanian sport